Alberto Piccinini (9 May 1942 – 13 May 2021) was an Argentine politician. A member of the Broad Front and later the Authentic Socialist Party (PSA), he served in the Argentine Chamber of Deputies from 2001 to 2005.

References

1942 births
2021 deaths
People from Santa Fe Province
Broad Front (Argentina) politicians
Members of the Argentine Chamber of Deputies elected in Santa Fe